Ballentine-Shealy House, also known as the Ballentine-Shealy-Slocum House, is a historic home located near Lexington, Lexington County, South Carolina. It was built in the late-18th or early-19th century, and is a -story, rectangular log building. It is sheathed in weatherboard and has a standing seam metal gable roof. It has shed rooms on the rear and a one-story shed-roofed front porch with an enclosed room. The house has a hall-and-parlor plan and an enclosed stair. An open breezeway connects the house to the kitchen (ca. 1870), which has a fieldstone and brick chimney and a side porch. Also on the property a dilapidated dairy, a small log barn, and a well house.

It was listed on the National Register of Historic Places in 1983.

References

Houses on the National Register of Historic Places in South Carolina
Log houses in the United States
Houses in Lexington County, South Carolina
National Register of Historic Places in Lexington County, South Carolina
Log buildings and structures on the National Register of Historic Places in South Carolina